Michaël Abiteboul is a French actor.

Filmography

Theatre

References

External links 

French male film actors
Living people
21st-century French male actors
Year of birth missing (living people)
Place of birth missing (living people)
20th-century French male actors
French male stage actors
French male television actors